The North East Rugby League Premier Divisions is the lower league in a 2 division structure in rugby league's tier 4. It is competed for by teams in the North East of England, Cumbria and North Yorkshire though in the past occasionally teams from West Yorkshire took part.

Many of the teams also run age group teams in the North East Junior League.

History

The Rugby League Conference was founded in 1997 as the Southern Conference, a 10-team pilot league for teams in the South of England and the English Midlands. The Conference began to include sides from the North of England from the 1999 season in a new Northern division though none of the teams were from the North East.

The Northern Rugby League Summer Conference was founded in 2000 outside the Rugby League Conference structure for teams in the North East of England and various British Amateur Rugby League Association leagues, it lasted one season. The Rugby League Conference added a North East division for the 2001 season featuring many of the Northern Conference sides.

The RLC Premier divisions were set up in 2005 and Jarrow Vikings, Peterlee Pumas and Sunderland City joined the North Premier with the rest of the sides coming from Cumbria.

The Premier divisions saw a change in boundaries in 2006 leaving the North Premier division covering a larger area to give the English Midlands clubs their own premier division without having to face heartland teams, no North East teams would take part in this season's North Premier. Winlaton Vulcans were replaced by Gateshead Storm A. Jarrow Vikings, Peterlee Pumas and Sunderland Nissan took part in the newly North regional division against teams from Cumbria.

The promotion of three teams to the RLC National Division left the already depleted Premier North unviable and an artificial North Premier was created out of two of the North East and North regional divisions. The North East division was scrapped and did not return until the 2009 season.

In 2011 the league was split into 2 divisions (premier and regional). In 2012 it became a stand-alone league.

Rugby league conference pyramid

 National Conference League
 North East Rugby League Division 1
 North East Rugby League Division 2

2015 structure
North East Division 2
 Cramlington Rockets A
 Durham Tigers
 Gateshead Storm A
 North Yorkshire Wildcats
 Wallsend Eagles A
 Warriors RL
 Whitley Bay Barbarians

Participating teams by season

Northern Rugby League Summer Conference
 2000: Bridlington Bulls, Gateshead Panthers, Teesside Steelers, West Craven Warriors and Wetherby Bulldogs

Rugby League Conference North East Division
 2001: Bridlington Bulls, Durham Phoenix (replacing Gateshead Panthers), Newcastle Knights, Sunderland City, Teesside Steelers
 2002: Bridlington Bulls, Durham Tigers, Newcastle Knights, Sunderland City, Teesside Steelers
 2003: Bridlington Bulls, Durham Tigers, Gateshead Storm, Leeds Akademiks, Newcastle Knights, Sunderland City, Whitley Bay Barbarians, Yorkshire Coast Tigers
 2004: Durham Tigers, Jarrow Vikings, Newcastle Knights, Peterlee Pumas, Sunderland City, Whitley Bay Barbarians, Yorkshire Coast Tigers
 2005: Catterick Panthers, Durham Tigers, Newcastle Knights, Scarborough Pirates, Whitley Bay Barbarians, Winlaton Vulcans
 2006: Catterick Panthers, Durham Tigers, Newcastle Knights, Whitley Bay Barbarians, Winlaton Vulcans
 2009: Hartlepool (failed to complete season), Jarrow Vikings, Newcastle Knights, Northallerton Stallions, Peterlee Pumas, Sunderland City, Whitley Bay Barbarians, Winlaton Warriors
 2010: Cramlington Rockets, Durham Demons, Jarrow Vikings, Newcastle Storm, Northallerton Stallions, Peterlee Pumas, Sunderland City, Wallsend Eagles, Whitley Bay Barbarians, Winlaton Warriors
 2011: Cramlington Rockets, Durham Demons, East Cumbria Crusaders, Hartlepool, North Yorkshire Stallions, Peterlee Pumas A, Warriors RL, Whitley Bay Barbarians,

North East Rugby League Regional Division
 2012: Consett Steelers, Cramlington Rockets, Durham Demons, Durham Tigers, Hartlepool, Miners, Peterlee Pumas A, Teesside Bulls, Warriors RL, Whitley Bay Barbarians
 2013: Consett Steelers, Darlington, Durham Demons, Durham Tigers, East Cumbria Crusaders, Peterlee Pumas A, Warriors RL, Whitley Bay Barbarians
 2015: Cramlington Rockets A, Durham Tigers, Gateshead Storm A, North Yorkshire Wildcats, Wallsend Eagles A, Warriors RL, Whitley Bay Barbarians

Merit Division
 2013: Cramlington Rockets A, Gateshead Storm A, Hartlepool West View Warriors, Miners (after dropping out of premier division), North Yorkshire Wildcats, Peterlee Pumas B

Winners

Northern Rugby League Summer Conference
2000 Teesside Steelers

North East Rugby League Regional Division
2001 Teesside Steelers 1
2002 Teesside Steelers 1
2003 Leeds Akademiks 1 (now Leeds Akkies) 
2004 Newcastle Knights 1 (now Gateshead Storm) 
2005 Durham Tigers 1
2009 Jarrow Vikings 1
2010 Jarrow Vikings 1
2011 North Yorkshire Stallions 1
2012 Cramlington Rockets 
2013 East Cumbria Crusaders
2014 Whitley Bay Barbarians
2015 Whitley Bay Barbarians
1 as Rugby League Conference North East Regional Division

References

External links
 North East rugby league site
 Darlington RLFC

Rugby League Conference
Sport in North East England
Rugby league in North Yorkshire